The Now newspaper, also referred to as Surrey Now, was a tabloid established in 1984 that publishes twice a week with local news on Surrey, North Delta and White Rock in the Canadian province of British Columbia.

In 2015, Glacier Media sold The Now to Black Press. Also in 2015, Now reporter Amy Reid received the S. Tara Singh Hayer journalism award due to work highlighting needs of homeless people.

In March 2017, Black Press, publisher of The Now and The Surrey Leader, announced that the two papers would be merged into a single paper as of April 5, 2017.  The merged paper was announced as The Surrey Now News-Leader.

See also
List of newspapers in Canada

References 

1984 establishments in British Columbia
Black Press
Newspapers published in Vancouver
Publications established in 1984
Surrey, British Columbia
Canadian news websites
Biweekly newspapers published in Canada